Jesus ben Ananias ("the son of Ananias" [rendered as the "son of Ananus" in the Whiston translation]) was a plebeian farmer, who, four years before the First Jewish-Roman War began in 66 AD, went around Jerusalem prophesying the city's destruction. The Jewish leaders of Jerusalem turned him over to the Romans, who tortured him. The procurator Lucceius Albinus took him to be a madman and released him. He continued his prophecy for more than seven years until he was killed by a stone from a catapult during the Roman siege of Jerusalem during the war. His name is rendered ישוע בן חנניה (Yeshua ben Hananiah) in modern Hebrew histories.

References

External links
 Project Gutenberg – Josephus catalog

Jews and Judaism in the Roman Empire
Prophets